KWTX-FM (97.5 MHz) is a commercial Top 40 (CHR) radio station in Waco, Texas.  Branded on air as  "97-5 FM", the station is owned and operated by iHeartMedia.  Its studios are located on Highway 6 in Waco, and its transmitter is located northeast of Moody, Texas.

KWTX-FM shares its callsign with talk radio formatted sister station KWTX (1230 AM) as well as CBS television affiliate KWTX-TV (Channel 10), owned by Gray Television.

History
KWTX-FM has been a Top 40/CHR station since February 1985. Prior to it, the station first signed on with an AOR format on December 1, 1970, and later switched to an easy listening/beautiful music format in 1978.

Former programming
Past morning shows include: " Darren and Chrissy in the morning" with Darren Taylor-Prater and Chrissy Donaldson.
Patrick "Flash Phillips" Davis.
Bobby Bones.
Chris Ling.
Jason "Jay" Charles

Other Past Jocks include: John "The Lama" Oakes, 
Todd Jenkins,
Jen Austin,
Michael "Magic Man" Wold-Steele,
Lori Scott,
Jeff "The Jammer" Peck,
David "Dangerboy" Meyer,
Dave Emley,
Vern Pecore,
Tamme Taylor,
Michael Yo,
Jeff Miles,
Tyler Thorsen,
Chris "Collins" Erlanson,
Kramer.

External links
KWTX-FM official website

WTX-FM
Contemporary hit radio stations in the United States
IHeartMedia radio stations